Kennaquhair may refer to
Kennaquhair, a fictional location in The Monastery and The Abbot
Kennaquhair, a fictional location in The Sword in the Stone
Kennaquhair, a thoroughbred racehorse